The Bayer designations l Velorum and L Velorum are distinct. Due to technical limitations, both designations link here. For the star
l Velorum, see HD 79917
L Velorum, see HD 83058

See also
i Velorum
I Velorum
λ Velorum (Lambda Velorum)

Velorum, l
Vela (constellation)